The Fujifilm FinePix S6500fd (fd signifying face detection), known in the United States as S6000fd, was the first digital camera from Fujifilm with face detection technology. Also this camera has a different lens from its recent predecessors — a 28–300 mm equivalent 10.7x zoom, the same as the FinePix S9100/9600. The camera was announced on July 13, 2006.

Features 
 Sensor: 6.3-megapixel 1/1.7-inch Super CCD HR - maximum resolution of 2848 × 2136
 Manual Mode. Program Mode. Shutter Priority. Aperture Priority and Scene Modes
 Sensitivity: ISO 100 to 3200 (incl. automatic mode)
 Shutter speed: 30 – 1/4000 sec (extremes depending on exposure mode) 
 Fujinon 10.7× optical zoom lens
 Focal length: 28–300 mm (35 mm equivalent)
 Aperture:  (wide)  (long)
 Video/audio recording and the ability to shoot RAW or jpeg images.
 Dual-shot mode
 Face detection technology

See also
Fujifilm FinePix S-series

References

Reviews
 Review from DPReview
 Fujifilm Finepix S6500fd Review at Photographyblog.com
 Fujifilm Finepix S6500fd Review at DCresource.com
 Fujifilm Finepix S6500fd Review at Cameras.co.uk

S6500fd
Bridge digital cameras
Cameras introduced in 2006